Kelly Weinersmith (née Smith) is an American scientist, New York Times best selling writer, and podcaster. She is a member of the faculty at Rice University, and an alumni collaborator with the Parasite Ecology Group at the University of California, Santa Barbara. She is a regular co-host of the Science... sort of podcast, and the co-author (with her husband, cartoonist Zach Weinersmith) of Soonish, a science book. She was a speaker at Smithsonian Magazine's "2015 Future Is Here Festival".

Research 

A parasitologist, Weinersmith is the co-discoverer of Euderus set, commonly known as the Cryptkeeper Wasp.

References 

Year of birth missing (living people)
Living people
American parasitologists
American women biologists
21st-century American women writers
Women science writers
American science writers
American podcasters
Rice University faculty
American women academics
American women podcasters